Berit Oskal Eira (1 March 1951 – 26 January 2021) was a Sami politician for the Labour Party.

She was elected to the Sami Parliament of Norway in 2001.

From 2005 to 2007, while the second cabinet Stoltenberg held office, she was appointed State Secretary in the Ministry of Labour and Social Inclusion.

References

Berit Oskal Eira - regjeringen.no

1951 births
2021 deaths
Labour Party (Norway) politicians
Members of the Sámi Parliament of Norway
Politicians from Tromsø
Norwegian Sámi politicians
Norwegian state secretaries
Norwegian women state secretaries